Nancy Alvarez may refer to:

Nancy Alvarez (psychologist) (born 1950), television personality, psychologist, sexologist and family therapist
Nancy Álvarez (triathlete) (born 1976), Argentine triathlete